The Hindu Pantheon was a book written by Edward Moor, an early European scholar of Indian religion. It was published in London in 1810.

The Hindu Pantheon was illustrated with examples from Moor's own collection of Hindu artifacts, which are currently displayed in the British Museum. Many of the illustrations were engraved by William Blake.

The Hindu Pantheon is illustrative of the Enlightenment concept of education of foreign cultures and religions; it was significant as it sought to dispel any European preconceptions that Hinduism was a largely primitive pagan religion. This book is also noted as of the first to provide a careful presentation of the Hinduism to English audience.

A copy of the book The Hindu Pantheon on Google books.

Chapters
Preface
Brahman
Brahma
Vishnu
Siva
Narayana
Viraj &c.
Brahmadicas &c.
Rishis &c.
Menus &c.
Munis &c
Pandus, Rudras &c.
Vasus, Maruts &c.
Pitris, Danavas & c.
Surs & c.
Asparas &c.
Viraj &c. (2)
Swayambhuva
Prithu and Prithivi and Viswacarma
The Sacti subtitled: Consorts, or Energies of Male Deities
Sects of Hindus
Saraswati
Lakshmi
Parvati
Ganesa, Kartikya, Vira Bhadra and Bhairava the offspring of Mahadeva and Parvati
Avataras
Indra and Genii, subordinate to him
Varuna
Kuvera
Nirrit
Surya, Chandra and Agni, subtitled: the REGENTS of the SUN, the MOON and of FIRE; and of some less important characters
Yama, Sani and Vrihaspati, subtitled: the REGENTS of HELL, and the PLANETS SATURN and JUPITER
Hanuman and his Sire Pavana, Ravana and Garuda and other characters of less note
Miscellaneous Notice of the Brahmans and Hindus
Linga-Yoni
Sectarial Marks, or Symbols, the Gayatri, O'm and other sacred texts and words reverenced by Hindus
Ballaji, Wittoba and Naneshwer, Avatarasof Vishnu and Kandeh Rao Avatara of Siva
Notice of the Unexplained Plates and of Ancient Hindu Coins and Medals
VedasPuranas &c.
Kama the God of Love
Index

References

Hinduism studies books
1810 non-fiction books